Julius Kazakauskas (born December 22, 1990 in Klaipėda) is a Lithuanian professional basketball player for the BC Gargždai-SC of the Lietuvos krepšinio lyga (LKL). He plays for power forward position.

References 

1990 births
Living people
Basketball players from Klaipėda
BC Dzūkija players
BC Lietkabelis players
BC Nevėžis players
BC Pieno žvaigždės players
Korvpalli Meistriliiga players
Lithuanian expatriate basketball people in Estonia
Lithuanian men's basketball players
Small forwards
University of Tartu basketball team players